Iftikhor (formerly Kirkkuduk) is a jamoat in north-west Tajikistan. It is located in Asht District in Sughd Region. The jamoat has a total population of 11,201 (2015). It consists of 7 villages, including Iftikhor (the seat) and Kattasarqamish.

References

Populated places in Sughd Region
Jamoats of Tajikistan